Max Tarnogrocki (4 September 1904 – 22 December 1993) was a German middle-distance runner. He competed in the men's 800 metres at the 1928 Summer Olympics.

References

External links

1904 births
1993 deaths
Athletes (track and field) at the 1928 Summer Olympics
German male middle-distance runners
Olympic athletes of Germany